Matt Brase (born June 15, 1982) is an American professional basketball coach who is the head coach of Pallacanestro Varese in the Italian Lega Basket Serie A (LBA) and Haiti men's national basketball team.

Playing career
Brase played for University of Arizona and led the team to the NCAA Division I men's basketball tournament, where they reached the Elite Eight in 2005. He was coached by his grandfather, basketball coach Lute Olson, from 2003 to 2005.

College coaching career
After graduation, Brase served in different capacities in the Arizona Wildcats basketball department. After being promoted to assistant coach at Arizona during the 2009, his team reached the Sweet 16.

For the 2009–11 seasons, Brase served as an assistant coach at Grand Canyon University while studying for his master's degree in business administration with a focus on leadership.

Professional coaching career
The Houston Rockets hired him in 2011. During the 2011–12 season he worked as part of the Rockets basketball operations staff focusing on player personnel and scouting college, international and NBA players. In 2012–2013 Brase served as an assistant coach for Rio Grande Valley Vipers. In 2013, he became the Director of Operations for the Houston Rockets. The Houston Rockets named him the head coach for the Rio Grande Valley Vipers beginning the 2015 season. In 2018, he became an Assistant coach for the Houston Rockets and led the team to an NBA D-League Western Conference title.

On July 6, 2022, he has signed with Pallacanestro Varese in the Italian Lega Basket Serie A (LBA).

Personal life
Brase’s father, Jon, is a dentist. He played baseball at Iowa. Brase's sister played for University of Arizona's women’s basketball team before becoming a coach at Loyola Marymount and then with the WNBA’s Phoenix Mercury. His mother, Jody, is the daughter of Lute Olson, and the Principal at Catalina Foothills High School.

References

1982 births
Living people
American men's basketball players
Forwards (basketball)
Arizona Wildcats men's basketball coaches
Arizona Wildcats men's basketball players
Basketball coaches from Arizona
Basketball players from Arizona
Basketball players from Tucson, Arizona
Central Arizona College alumni
Grand Canyon Antelopes men's basketball coaches
Houston Rockets assistant coaches
Junior college men's basketball players in the United States
Pallacanestro Varese coaches
Rio Grande Valley Vipers coaches